Tracey Baptiste (born 7 March 1972) is a children's horror author from the Caribbean who uses folk stories in her novels.

Biography
Born in Trinidad in 1972, Tracey Baptiste moved to Brooklyn, NY, when she was fifteen. She received with an M.Ed. in elementary education from New York University after finishing a B.A. in English and Comparative Literature.

Baptiste went on to work as an elementary school teacher and then a textbook editor. She lives in New Jersey where she works on her own novels and is part of the faculty in Lesley University where she is part of their creative writing MFA program. 

Baptiste wrote The Crash, a Minecraft novel which debuted on the New York Times best seller list in 2018. She also writes nonfiction books for children.

Selected works 

Angel's Grace (2005)
The Totally Gross History of Ancient Egypt (2016)

Minecraft Universe 

The Crash (2018)

The Jumbies 

The Jumbies (2015)
Rise of the Jumbies (2017)
The Jumbies God's Revenge (2019)

Short fiction 

 Ma Laja (2017)

Anthologies 

 Black Enough (2019) (as editor)

References

Further reading 

 Q&A with Publishers Weekly

External links 

 Official website
 Lesley University faculty page
Tracey Baptiste at the Internet Speculative Fiction Database
Interviews at Colorin Colorado
Interview with NPR

1972 births
Trinidad and Tobago women writers
21st-century women writers
People from New Jersey
New York University alumni
Living people